Venderevo is a village (selo) in Kromskoy District of Oryol Oblast, Russia.

References

Rural localities in Oryol Oblast